Ouésso Airport  is an airport serving Ouésso, the capital of the Sangha Department in the Republic of the Congo. Ouésso is on the Sangha River, at the point where it meets the Cameroon border.

Airlines and destinations

See also

List of airports in the Republic of the Congo
Transport in the Republic of the Congo

References

External links
 OpenStreetMap - Ouésso
 FallingRain - Ouésso Airport
 OurAirports - Ouésso
 
 

Sangha Department (Republic of the Congo)
Airports in the Republic of the Congo